Sylvie Béliveau (born 8 December 1963) is a Canadian soccer coach.

Career
Béliveau was the head coach of the Canada women's national team at the 1995 FIFA Women's World Cup.

References

External links
 
 / Canada Soccer Hall of Fame
 
 Sylvie Béliveau at Soccerdonna.de 

1963 births
Living people
Canadian women's soccer coaches
Women's association football managers
Canada women's national soccer team managers
1995 FIFA Women's World Cup managers
Female association football managers